Alfred N. King (born 25 September 1941) is a former Australian rules footballer who played for the Essendon Football Club in the Victorian Football League (VFL). He also played for the Carlton's reserves.

Notes

External links 
		

Essendon Football Club past player profile
Blueseum profile

1941 births
Living people
Australian rules footballers from Victoria (Australia)
Essendon Football Club players